The Piano Sonata in B major  575 by Franz Schubert is a sonata for solo piano, posthumously published as Op. 147 and given a dedication to Sigismond Thalberg by its publishers.  Schubert composed the sonata in August 1817.

Movements
I. Allegro ma non troppo (B major)

Uses a four-key exposition (B major, G major, E major, F-sharp major).

II. Andante (E major)

III. Scherzo: Allegretto – Trio (G major, D major)

IV. Allegro giusto (B major)

The work takes approximately 24 minutes to perform.

Daniel Coren has noted that the first movement of this sonata is the only such movement in Schubert's sonatas where the recapitulation is an exact transposition of the exposition.

Notes

References
 Tirimo, Martino. Schubert: The Complete Piano Sonatas. Vienna: Wiener Urtext Edition, 1997.

External links
 
Performance by Seymour Lipkin from the Isabella Stewart Gardner Museum in MP3 format

1817 compositions
Piano sonatas by Franz Schubert
Compositions by Franz Schubert published posthumously
Compositions in B major